Arthur Mahon (1716–1788) was an Irish Anglican priest.

The son of Peter Mahon, Dean of Elphin from 1700 to 1739, he was born in County Roscommon and educated at Trinity College, Dublin. He held livings at Estersnow, Killuken, Kilcolagh, Tumna and Creeve. He was appointed  Archdeacon of Elphin in 1743. He resigned in 1750 for the Prebendal Stall of Howth in St Patrick's Cathedral, Dublin.

References 

Archdeacons of Elphin
Alumni of Trinity College Dublin
People from County Roscommon
18th-century Irish Anglican priests
1788 deaths
1716 births